This is a list of area codes in the U.S. state of Georgia.

History
In 1947, Georgia was a single numbering plan area (NPA) with area code 404. In 1954, 912 was assigned to its southern and central areas.

The state operated with two area codes until May 3, 1992, when area code 706 was created for the two separate areas outside of the metro Atlanta area.  Due to complaints from exurban residents who were to be put in 706, they were moved back into 404, which makes every new area code added to the metro area run out of numbers sooner.  At this time, these areas were also fully included in what was already the world's largest toll-free local calling zone (previously many were only able to call the adjacent telephone exchanges on the edge of metro Atlanta).  Area code 770 was therefore assigned to Atlanta's suburbs just three years later in August 1995, requiring ten-digit dialing between them, and with all mobile phones keeping 404.  678 was given to both the city and its suburbs in January 1998, becoming the first overlay area code in the state, and forcing mandatory ten-digit dialing for all calls.  

Flip-flopping on its position on assigning new area codes, the Georgia Public Service Commission dictated that a double split of 912 would occur after that, with 229 and 478 being applied to southwest Georgia and central Georgia in August 2000. With the GPSC reversing course a third time, 470 became the second area code to overlay Atlanta in September 2001, but remained unused until 2010. In September 2005, 762 was overlaid to all of the existing area code 706, despite the fact that it has been physically split into two separate and disconnected sections since it was created in 1992.

Georgia is served by ten area codes. The newest area code, 943, went into service in March 2022 as another area code for the Atlanta area.

List of area codes
229 – Albany, Thomasville, Valdosta, Tifton, Cairo Georgia, Fitzgerald and Americus (southwest Georgia)
404 – Atlanta and immediate environs (central Fulton and DeKalb counties)
470 – Atlanta and its suburbs, overlay area code that covers same area as 678, 770, and 943
478 – Macon, Forsyth, Fort Valley, Warner Robins, Dublin, Eastman and Milledgeville (central Georgia)
706 – Columbus (west-central Georgia);  Rome, Dahlonega, Toccoa, Athens and Augusta (northwest, northeast, upper east-central Georgia)
678 – Atlanta and its suburbs, overlay area code that covers the same area as 404, 470, 770, and 943
762 – same boundaries as 706
770 – Atlanta suburbs, overlay area code that covers the same area as 470, 678, and 943
912 – Savannah, Reidsville, Vidalia, Waycross, Brunswick, Douglas, and coastal Georgia
943 - Atlanta and its suburbs, overlay area code that covers same area as 470, 678, and 770.

Mobile numbers in metro Atlanta may now have 404, 470, 678, 770, or 943 after originally being kept in 404 by BellSouth.

See also

References

 
Georgia (U.S. state)
Area codes